The Rt Rev Wilmot Lushington Vyvyan (12 August 1861 – 26 August 1937) was an Anglican Bishop in the mid-20th century.

Background
Born into a noble family on 12 August 1861, Wilmot Vyvyan was educated at Charterhouse and Trinity College, Cambridge.

Career
Ordained in 1888, he was curate at the Charterhouse Mission, St Hugh's, Southwark, becoming its priest in charge from 1892 until 1901, when he emigrated to South Africa. Here he was mission priest at Isandhlwana before elevation to the episcopate as the fourth bishop of Zululand in 1903, a post he was to hold for 26 years. He died on 26 August 1937.

References

Bibliography

External links 

 
 Genealogical web-site
 Rootsweb
 University of the Witwatersrand

1861 births
People educated at Charterhouse School
Alumni of Trinity College, Cambridge
Anglican bishops of Zululand
20th-century Anglican Church of Southern Africa bishops
1937 deaths